Modelo Brewery designed by the Cuban architect, Enrique Luis Varela, was built in 1948 for Compañia Ron Bacardi S.A.  Its address is the Corner of 52 and Carretera Central, Cotorro, Havana, Cuba.  In 1952 Ernest Hemingway featured Hatuey beer in his book The Old Man and the Sea.  When he was awarded the Nobel Prize for Literature, the company threw him a party at the Modelo Brewery.  Hemingway was a frequent patron of the brewery since it was located near to his home in Havana at Finca Vigía.

Architecture
This building has monumental proportions typical of Varela's works (Revolution Square in Havana), with a modern aesthetic.  The corner is a cylinder that becomes a hinge between the two facades. One side is dotted with small windows and the other almost blank and marked by horizontal bands reminiscent of the Streamline Moderne architecture style.

The building was to service Cuba's growing demand for Hatuey beer. This brewery was constructed ten miles from Havana in a site named El Cotorro in 1948. Being true to its name, it was a state-of-the-art facility, a model brewery. In Modelo's first nineteen months of production, 3.5 million liters of beer were produced. and in 1959, 10 million cases were produced and Hatuey Beer controlled 50% of Cuba's beer market.

Confiscation

On 14 October 1960, after 34 years of uninterrupted growth, Compañía Ron Bacardi S.A.’s Cuban assets, including the three Hatuey Breweries, were confiscated by the revolutionary government, and Hatuey lost its market.  During this period, sales of Hatuey Beer were 12,000,000 cases per year.
Beginning in 2011, the Bacardi family again began making beers in the United States to market under the Hatuey label.

References

1984 establishments in Cuba
Buildings and structures in Havana
Beer in Cuba
Architecture in Havana
20th-century architecture in Cuba